The serrated hinged terrapin (Pelusios sinuatus) is a species of turtle in the family Pelomedusidae. The species is native to East Africa and Southern Africa. There are two recognised subspecies.

Geographic range
P. sinuatus is found in Botswana, Democratic Republic of the Congo, Ethiopia, Kenya, Malawi, Mozambique, Somalia, South Africa, South Sudan, Tanzania, Zambia, and Zimbabwe.

Habitat and behaviour
The preferred natural habitats of P. sinuatus are tropical lakes and rivers, where it can often be seen basking on logs, rocks, or mud banks, or even on the backs of sleeping hippopotami.

Diet
P. sinuatus eats water snails, soft-weed, and insects.

Description
Females are larger than males. Males can also be distinguished by their slightly longer tails.

Defence
For defence, the hinged plastron of P. sinuatus closes to protect the head and forelimbs. The serrated hinged terrapin also secretes a foul odour when threatened.

Breeding
Hatchlings appear in March to April.

Subspecies
The following two subspecies are recognised as being valid, including the nominotypical subspecies.
Pelusios sinuatus bottegi 
Pelusios sinuatus sinuatus

Etymology
The subspecific name, bottegi is in honour of Italian explorer Vittorio Bottego.

See also
Pelomedusa subrufa, a similar species

References

Further reading
Schmidt KP (1919). "Contributions to the Herpetology of the Belgian Congo Based on the Collection of the American Museum Congo Expedition, 1909–1915. Part I. Turtles, Crocodiles, Lizards, and Chameleons". Bulletin of the American Museum of Natural History 39 (2): 385–624 + Plates VII–XXXII. (Pelusios sinuatus, new combination, p. 401).
Smith A (1838). Illustrations of the Zoology of South Africa; Consisting Chiefly of Figures and Descriptions of the Objects of Natural History Collected during an Expedition into the Interior of South Africa, in the Years 1834, 1835, and 1836; Fitted out by "The Cape of Good Hope Association for the Exploring Central Africa:" Together with a Summary of African Zoology, and an Inquiry into the Geographical Ranges of Species in that Quarter of the Globe. [Volume III. Reptilia.] London: Lords Commissioners of Her Majesty's Treasury. (Smith, Elder and Co., printers). 48 Plates + unnumbered pages of text. (Sternotherus sinuatus, new species, Plate I + two unnumbered pages). (in English and Latin).
Spawls S, Howell K, Hinkel H, Menegon M (2018). Field Guide to East African Reptiles, Second Edition. London: Bloomsbury Natural History.624 pp. . (Pelusios sinuatus, p. 60).

serrated hinged terrapin
Reptiles of East Africa
serrated hinged terrapin